Minister for Veterans Issues is a position in the government of Western Australia, currently held by Peter Tinley of the Labor Party. The position was first created after the 2013 state election, for the government of Colin Barnett. The minister is responsible for the state government's Veterans Advisory Council.

For a period after World War I, in the governments of Hal Colebatch and James Mitchell, there was a Minister for Repatriation, who had broadly similar duties to the current minister.

List of veterans ministers

List of repatriation ministers

See also
 Minister for Community Services (Western Australia)

References
 David Black (2014), The Western Australian Parliamentary Handbook (Twenty-Third Edition). Perth [W.A.]: Parliament of Western Australia.

Veterans
Minister for Veterans